This is a list of video games for the Wii U video game console that have sold or shipped at least one million copies. The best-selling game on the Wii U is Mario Kart 8. First released in Japan on May 29, 2014, it went on to sell over 8.4 million units worldwide.

There are a total of 21 Wii U games on this list which are confirmed to have sold or shipped at least one million units. Of these, eleven were developed by internal Nintendo development divisions. Of the 21 games on this list, 20 were published in one or more regions by Nintendo.

By September 30, 2022, over 103.53million total copies of games had been sold for the Wii U.

List

Notes

References

External links
 Nintendo IR Information - Wii U Software

 
Wii U
Best-selling Wii U video games